Hare Creek is a  long 3rd order tributary to Brokenstraw Creek.  It is classed as a cold-water/warm-water fishery by the Pennsylvania Fish and Boat Commission.

Course
Hare Creek rises on the divide between it and French Creek in Chautauqua County, New York about 2 miles southeast of Cutting and flows southeast to meet Brokenstraw Creek about 3 miles southeast of Corry, Pennsylvania.

Watershed
Hare Creek drains  of the northwestern glaciated plateau and is underlaid by the Venango Formation. The watershed receives an average of 47.4 in/year of precipitation and has a wetness index of 457.12.  The watershed is about 47% forested.

See also 
 List of rivers of Pennsylvania

References

Rivers of Pennsylvania
Rivers of New York (state)
Tributaries of the Allegheny River
Rivers of Erie County, Pennsylvania
Rivers of Warren County, Pennsylvania
Rivers of Chautauqua County, New York